Joshua Mario Gracin (born October 18, 1980) is an American country music singer. A former member of the United States Marine Corps, he first gained public attention as the fourth-place finalist on the second season of American Idol.

After his elimination from the show, Gracin completed his service in the Marine Corps, and after his honorable discharge, he signed a record deal with Lyric Street Records. His self-titled debut album was released in 2004. It produced a number one hit, "Nothin' to Lose", and two more top five hits on the Billboard Hot Country Singles & Tracks charts, and was certified gold by the Recording Industry Association of America. His second album, We Weren't Crazy, followed in 2008. This album produced five more chart singles, including a top ten in its title track. After signing with Average Joe's in 2010 he released "Cover Girl."

Biography
Gracin was born on October 18, 1980, to Mario and Brenda Gracin, and was raised in Westland, Michigan. He has four sisters: Stacy, April, Melissa and Kristen.  He grew up listening to Elvis, the Beatles and to vintage rock and pop on a favorite local station. When he was 11 the station changed its format to country, and he was introduced to artists such as Garth Brooks, Joe Diffie, George Strait and Randy Travis. These artist's songs immediately caught his interest. "There’s not another genre that better reflects situations in my life," Gracin said.
 His vocal debut was in an Easter musical presented by his local church. His first public appearance was at an eighth grade talent competition where he sang Brooks' 1993 hit "Standing Outside the Fire" and easily won over an audience full of more traditional dance music-loving cohorts.

Later, Gracin auditioned, as the only male, for a national pop orchestra and vocal competition, known as the Fairlane Youth Pops Orchestra, and won as a sophomore in high school.  During his high school career Gracin performed at state festivals, fairs, and pageants throughout the State of Michigan.  At 16, he performed on stage at the Grand Ole Opry in a national talent show  and recorded a demo CD in Nashville, Tennessee.

Upon graduation from John Glenn High School in Westland, he attended Western Michigan University before he joined the United States Marine Corps.  After basic training, he returned to marry his wife and was assigned to Camp Pendleton as a supply clerk.

Musical career

2003-2005: Josh Gracin
In 2003, Gracin auditioned for the second season of American Idol. He made it to the finals and eventually came in fourth place on the show. However, because of his earlier commitment to the Marine Corps, Gracin was not able to participate in the lucrative American Idol Finalists tour of American venues.  Gracin was instead sent on a year-long tour as a recruiter, making appearances at special events around the United States to promote the United States Marine Corps. After completing his fourth year of service, he was honorably discharged in September 2004.

Gracin's true transition from reality show finalist to recording star began when he sang Rascal Flatts' "I'm Movin' On" on one episode of American Idol. As Rascal Flatts watched that episode on their tour bus, bass player Jay DeMarcus was impressed with Gracin's talent and reached out to him. He connected Gracin with Marty Williams, who had co-produced both of Rascal Flatts' breakthrough album and its successful follow-up. That set in motion a series of events (with a short one-year break to finish his Marine stint) that led to a record deal with Lyric Street Records in 2004. His debut album Josh Gracin was released on June 15, 2004, and was certified gold. The album's first three singles ("I Want to Live," "Nothin' to Lose," and "Stay with Me [Brass Bed]"), all reached the top five on the Billboard Hot Country Singles & Tracks chart, with "Nothin' to Lose," the second of those three, reaching Number One.

In 2005, Gracin also contributed the song "Working for the Weekend" to the Herbie: Fully Loaded soundtrack, and he also sang on "When I See an Elephant Fly" on the Jim Brickman album The Disney Songbook.  At a performance in 2006, Gracin filled in, with good reviews, for Lonestar's lead vocalist Richie McDonald in concert when McDonald was recovering from a back injury.

2006-2008: We Weren't Crazy
In March 2006, Gracin released his fourth single, "Favorite State of Mind." Although it was a Top 20 hit on the country chart, Gracin's second album was delayed. Originally slated to be titled All About Y'all, the second album was later re-titled I Keep Coming Back and then finally We Weren't Crazy, after the title of its third single. "We Weren't Crazy," the third release from the album, entered the country music charts in October 2007, and for the chart week dated August 2, 2008 (40 weeks after it debuted on the charts), it reached a peak of number 10. The album was finally released on April 1, 2008. A fourth single, "Unbelievable (Ann Marie)", was released to country radio on August 25, 2008. Gracin wrote the song about his wife. "Telluride," a song originally recorded by Tim McGraw on his 2001 album Set This Circus Down, was released as the album's fifth and final single. Gracin was dropped from Lyric Street Records following the release of "Telluride."

2009-2011: Redemption
A new song, "Enough", was posted on his MySpace page on May 1, 2009, and released to radio in June 2009. According to his blog, Gracin wrote the song   and enlisted Lonestar's Dean Sams to co-produce it.  "Enough" is his favorite song in this collection and he said, "writing this song felt like a turning point artistically. I was better able to take what was going on in my head and get it onto paper in a way I feel is relatable to so many."  In the entry, Gracin also said it is his first project since leaving Lyric Street Records. The second single, "She's A Different Kind Of Crazy" was released in August 2009.

In January 2010, Gracin signed with Average Joe's Entertainment. His first single under Average Joe's, "Cover Girl," was released in August 2010. Gracin's third album, Redemption, was released on November 8, 2011. The album's next single, "Long Way to Go," became Gracin's first single to chart on the adult contemporary chart.

Personal life
Gracin was married to Ann Marie. They have three daughters: Briana Marie Gracin, born March 30, 2002; Gabriella Ann Gracin, born November 15, 2006; and Isabella Sophia Gracin, born November 12, 2008; as well as a son, Landon Joshua Gracin, born August 4, 2005. After his Idol stint and his discharge from the Marine Corps, he moved to Tennessee in pursuit of his singing career.

Relations with his wife soured. On August 14, 2014, Gracin left a goodbye note on his Facebook account interpreted by some media as being a suicide note, particularly when it was tipped off to TMZ, and the note went viral. He was placed on a psychiatric hold in a hospital, but was later released after voluntarily checking himself into an inpatient psychiatric facility. Gracin has maintained the note was not meant as a suicide note, rather as he says a "poorly worded" painful separation letter as his wife insisted on divorcing him. Ann Marie, his wife of 13 years, filed for divorce shortly after. Gracin shared new music, apologized and indicated he was on the road to recovery. In October 2015, Gracin became engaged to his new girlfriend Katie Weir. The couple married on May 6, 2017. The single "Nothin' Like Us" is reference to his new relationship.

On July 10, 2019, Gracin and Weir announced they were expecting their first child together. Their son, Luka Roman Gracin, was born on January 13, 2020.

Songs performed on American Idol

 Due to Corey Clark's disqualification, the Top 9 performances became Top 8 when no one was eliminated.

Discography

Studio albums

Extended plays

Singles

Other charted songs

Music videos

See also

References

External links
Official website

1980 births
21st-century American singers
American country singer-songwriters
American Idol participants
United States Marine Corps personnel of the Iraq War
American male singer-songwriters
Living people
Lyric Street Records artists
Singer-songwriters from Michigan
People from Westland, Michigan
United States Marines
Average Joes Entertainment artists
Country musicians from Michigan
21st-century American male singers